Prince's Wharf, or Princes Wharf, may refer to:

 Princes Wharf, Auckland, a wharf in Auckland Harbour, Auckland, New Zealand
 Prince's Wharf, Bristol, a wharf in Bristol Harbour, Bristol, England